is a single by Japanese boy band Kis-My-Ft2. It was released on August 14, 2013. It debuted in number one on the weekly Oricon Singles Chart and reached number one on the Billboard Japan Hot 100. It was the 19th best-selling single in Japan in 2013, with 309,762 copies.

References 

2013 singles
2013 songs
Japanese-language songs
Kis-My-Ft2 songs
Oricon Weekly number-one singles
Billboard Japan Hot 100 number-one singles
Japanese television drama theme songs